Daniel Hristov Gadzhev (born 21 June 1985) is a Bulgarian footballer who plays as a midfielder for Bulgarian Second League club Yantra Gabrovo

Career
Gadzhev was out of contract with Belasitsa Petrich when he was signed by Montana on 5 February 2008.

After joining Montana, he became the club captain in August 2009. On 19 March 2012, Gadzhev was sent off against CSKA Sofia in a 2–0 defeat, marking his fourth match during 2011–12 season in which he had been shown a red card. On 25 March he was sent off for fifth time during campaign, in a game against Botev Vratsa. On 23 May 2012, Gadzhev made his 100th league appearance for Montana in a 2–4 home defeat against Chernomorets Burgas.

During the summer of 2012, Gadzhev was transferred to Lokomotiv Sofia.

In January 2017 Gadzhev returned to Montana, signing a 6-month contract. He left the club in June when his contract expired.

In July 2017, Gadzhev joined Botev Vratsa.

Career statistics

References

External links

1985 births
Living people
Bulgarian footballers
First Professional Football League (Bulgaria) players
Second Professional Football League (Bulgaria) players
PFC Belasitsa Petrich players
FC Montana players
FC Lokomotiv 1929 Sofia players
Neftochimic Burgas players
FC Botev Vratsa players
Association football midfielders
People from Ihtiman
Sportspeople from Sofia Province